A juvenile is an individual organism (especially an animal) that has not yet reached its adult form, sexual maturity or size. Juveniles can look very different from the adult form, particularly in colour, and may not fill the same niche as the adult form. In many organisms the juvenile has a different name from the adult (see List of animal names).

Some organisms reach sexual maturity in a short metamorphosis, such as ecdysis in many insects and some other arthropods. For others, the transition from juvenile to fully mature is a more prolonged process—puberty in humans and other species (like higher primates and whales), for example. In such cases, juveniles during this transformation are sometimes called subadults.

Many invertebrates, on reaching the adult stage, are fully mature and their development and growth stops. Their juveniles are larvae or nymphs.

In vertebrates and some invertebrates (e.g. spiders), larval forms (e.g. tadpoles) are usually considered a development stage of their own, and "juvenile" refers to a post-larval stage that is not fully grown and not sexually mature. In amniotes, the embryo represents the larval stage. Here, a "juvenile" is an individual in the time between hatching/birth/germination and reaching maturity.

Examples
 For animal larval juveniles, see larva
 Juvenile birds or bats can be called fledglings
 For human juvenile life stages, see childhood and adolescence, an intermediary period between the onset of puberty and full physical, psychological, and social adulthood

References

Developmental biology

pt:Filhote